= Sins of the Shovel =

2023 non-fiction book by Rachel Morgan

Sins of the Shovel: Looting, Murder, and the Evolution of American Archaeology is a 2023 non-fiction book by American archaeologist and writer Rachel Morgan.

Morgan graduated from University of York and the University of Alabama at Birmingham. Her work appeared in The Collector.
